Burlington Junction may refer to:

 Burlington Junction, Missouri, United States
 Burlington Junction Railway, a Class III short line railroad